Łukasz Piątek (born 21 September 1985) is a Polish professional footballer who plays for Polonia Warsaw as a midfielder.

Playing career
He began his career in the youth system of Polonia Warsaw. During the 2005–06 season, Piątek was promoted to the 1st team. Piątek played in 2 league games and 2 cup games during the season. He was substituted in during the 21st minute against Odra Wodzisław Śląski earning his debut. The following season, he played in 16 matches scoring a goal.

On 21 June 2017 he signed a contract with Bruk-Bet Termalica Nieciecza.

On 26 September 2018 he joined ŁKS Łódź.

On 14 July 2020, after seven years, he returned to Polonia Warsaw (then III liga). Recently the club competes in II liga, and Piątek is the current team captain.

Honours
Polonia Warsaw
III liga, group I: 2021–22

References

External links
 

1985 births
Footballers from Warsaw
Living people
Polish footballers
Association football midfielders
Polonia Warsaw players
Zagłębie Lubin players
Bruk-Bet Termalica Nieciecza players
ŁKS Łódź players
Ekstraklasa players
I liga players
II liga players
III liga players